Six Flags Hurricane Harbor Concord is a water park located in Concord, California. It was initially developed, owned, and operated by Premier Parks. It is currently owned by EPR Properties and operated by Six Flags.

History
Waterworld California, originally Waterworld USA, opened in 1995. It was developed by what was then Premier Parks, which also leased and operated the original WaterWorld USA (now Raging Waters Sacramento). Premier Parks also owned nearby Marine World Africa USA (now Six Flags Discovery Kingdom). The three parks were operated by the same management, and their close proximity made for deals so that season passes to Marine World also worked at the Waterworld USA parks. Premier Parks acquired Six Flags on April 1, 1998, and eventually changed its name to Six Flags Inc. In 1998 Six Flags began rebranding numerous properties, however, the Waterworld parks were not renamed until 2003, when they became Six Flags Waterworld. At the end of the 2006 season, Six Flags divested itself of multiple properties including the two Waterworld parks. The Concord park was purchased by CNL Lifestyle Properties on January 11, 2007. Multiple CNL properties, including Waterworld, were operated by Premier Parks LLC — although similar in name, it was not the same company that built the park. In November 2016, CNL sold its recreational assets, including Waterworld, to EPR Properties. Premier Parks LLC continued to manage Waterworld. On April 27, 2017, Six Flags Entertainment Corporation announced it would take over the park's operations from Premier Parks, LLC. On February 22, 2018, Six Flags announced the name of the park would change to Six Flags Hurricane Harbor Concord.

Due to the growing concerns of the COVID-19 pandemic, Six Flags announced a suspension of operations across the company on March 13, 2020. In early August, the water park announced on their social media that the 2020 operating season had been canceled and that Six Flags Hurricane Harbor Concord looks forward to open again in 2021. This would be the first season for the water park to not operate since its inception in 1995.

Incidents
On June 2, 1997, the Banzai Pipeline collapsed after students piled into the water slide in an attempt to break a school record. A section of the slide gave way under the weight of the students, all of whom had congregated in the section in particular, resulting in the group falling several metres to the ground. The collapse of the water slide resulted in 32 injuries and the death of an 18-year-old female. It was stated that the slide experienced weight forces three times greater than what it was designed for. This incident was featured on an episode of Dateline.

Park names
 Waterworld USA Concord             (1995–2003)
 Six Flags Waterworld               (2004–2006)
 Waterworld California              (2007–2017)
 Six Flags Hurricane Harbor Concord (2018–present)

Rides
Break Point Plunge - A ProSlide SkyBOX/SuperLOOP Launch capsule slide, opened 2015 
Breaker Beach - Wave Pool, opened 1995
Caribbean Cove - Kids Play Area previously named Treasure Island, opened 1995
Honolulu Halfpipe - A Waterfun Products Sidewinder, Opened 2002 
Hurricane Slide Complex- 4 Body Slides, 2 WhiteWater West AquaTubes and 2 Pool Siders, opened 1995
Kaanapali Kooler - Lazy River, opened 1995
Splashwater Island - A WhiteWater West RainFortress 4Rb kids play structure, opened 2018 
The Big Kahuna - A WhiteWater West Family Faft Ride, opened 1999
Tornado - ProSlide Tornado 60 Slide, opened 2005
Typhoon Slide Complex - 4 Two Person ProSlide PIPEline Raft Slides, opened 1995

Former Rides
Cliffhanger - 2 Speeds Slides, a WhiteWater West Speed Slide and a Freefall Plus, opened 1995. Closed due to part of the structure breaking and the ride being deemed unsafe to operate.
Diablo Falls - WhiteWater West Drop Slide into pool, opened 1996, closed in 2017
Dragon Tails - WhiteWater West Family body slides removed in 2017 for Splashwater Island

References

External links
Six Flags Hurricane Harbor Concord Homepage

 
Buildings and structures in Concord, California
1995 establishments in California
Tourist attractions in Contra Costa County, California
Water parks in California
Former PARC Management theme parks